Richard Godfrey was a priest who worked as a missionary for the Anglican Church in Melanesia. 

Godfrey was educated at St John's College, Auckland and ordained in 1916. After a curacy in Middleton, Christchurch, New Zealand he was a missionary on Banks Island from 1918 to 1919. He was subsequently at Pentecost Island from 1920 to 1927, and on the Solomon Islands from 1928. He was Archdeacon of Southern Melanesia from 1934 to 1935. After his missionary service he served the church in Sydney, Aramoho, Grey Lynn, Onehunga and Point Chevalier.

References

Anglican missionaries in Australia
20th-century Anglican priests
People educated at St John's College, Auckland
Archdeacons of Southern Melanesia
Year of birth missing
Year of death missing
Anglican missionaries in the Solomon Islands
Anglican missionaries in Vanuatu
New Zealand Anglican missionaries